The Valley of the Sun Stage Race is a multi-day cycling race held in Phoenix, Arizona. The race takes annually in February and is contested over three days.

Winners

References

External links

Cycle races in the United States
Recurring sporting events established in 1992
1992 establishments in Arizona
Sports competitions in Arizona